Alexander or Alex Douglas may refer to:

 Alexander Douglas (bishop-designate) (fl. 1528), Scottish noble and cleric, bishop-elect of Moray
 Alexander Douglas (bishop) (died 1623), Roman Catholic Bishop of Moray, Scotland
 Sir Alexander Douglas (Orkney and Shetland) (died 1718), Member of Parliament for Orkney and Shetland, 1708–1713
 Alexander Douglas-Hamilton, Marquess of Douglas and Clydesdale (born 1978), Scottish aristocrat
 Alexander Edgar Douglas (1916–1981), Canadian physicist
 Alexander Stuart Douglas (1921–1998), physician and haematologist
 Alex Douglas (footballer), Scottish footballer
 Alex Douglas (politician) (born 1958), Queensland Member of Parliament for Gaven
 A.S. Douglas (Alexander Shafto Douglas, born 1921), British professor of computer science
 Alex Douglas, a character in the 1984 American film The Ambassador

See also
Sandy Douglass (1904–1992), racer, designer, and builder of sailing dinghies
Alec Douglas-Home (1903–1995), Prime Minister of the United Kingdom
Alec Douglas (1939–2014), South African cricketer

Alexander Douglas-Hamilton (disambiguation)